Dongen is a municipality and a village in the southern Netherlands. In the past it was home to a profitable leather industry, to which a few old shoe factories in the town's older sections still testify. The town is formed near a small river called "Donge" (about ten feet across), the water of which was used extensively for the leather industry.  The Aerts Automobile was built here in 1899.

Population centres 
Dongen (population: 22,270)
's Gravenmoer (2,220)
Vaart (500)
Klein-Dongen (220)

Topography

Dutch topographic map of the municipality of Dongen, June 2015

Politics 
The municipal council consists of 21 chairs. You can find the composition of the council since 1998 below:

Notable residents 

 Theodorus Marinus Roest (1832–1898) a numismatist and conservator of the Teylers Museum
 Laurens van Kuik (1889 in 's Gravenmoer – 1963) a teacher and then an autodidact painter.
 Karel Willemen (born 1967) a Dutch designer, contributed to the fantasy-themed amusement park Efteling 
 Kelly van Zon (born 1987) a table tennis player
 Nadine Broersen (born 1990) a Dutch track and field athlete in the heptathlon and high jump
 Anne Haast (born 1993) chess player, Woman Grandmaster
 Job van Uitert (born 1998), racing driver

Gallery

References

External links

Official website

 
Municipalities of North Brabant
Populated places in North Brabant